The Slave is a 1953 French-Italian drama film directed by Yves Ciampi and starring Daniel Gélin, Eleonora Rossi Drago and Barbara Laage.

Plot summary

Cast

Citations

General bibliography 
 Rège, Philippe. Encyclopedia of French Film Directors, Volume 1. Scarecrow Press, 2009.

External links 
 
 

1953 films
French drama films
Italian drama films
1953 drama films
1950s French-language films
Films directed by Yves Ciampi
Films about heroin addiction
French black-and-white films
Italian black-and-white films
1950s French films
1950s Italian films